Regions of Germany may refer to:

 Natural regions of Germany
 Government regions of Germany, a second-level administrative division
 NUTS statistical regions of Germany

See also
 Subdivisions of Germany
 :Category:Historical regions in Germany
 List of historic states of Germany